"Do It like a Dude" is the debut single by English singer-songwriter Jessie J. The song was released as the lead single from her debut album, Who You Are. It was released as a download in November 2010 in the United Kingdom with a physical release in January 2011. It peaked at number two in the United Kingdom, number eight in New Zealand and Belgium, and number eleven in Ireland. "Do It like a Dude" was awarded Best Song at the 2011 MOBO Awards.

Jessie J co-wrote the song with The Invisible Men members George Astasio and Jason Pebworth, who were former members of Orson and had penned hits for Sugababes ("Easy"), Noisettes ("Never Forget You") and Gabriella Cilmi ("On a Mission"); Jon Shave, who is also part of The Invisible Men, but had also been part of Xenomania; Kyle Abrahams, who had worked with Chipmunk and N-Dubz; and Parker Ighile, who wrote "Oopsy Daisy", a UK number-one hit for Chipmunk. Although "Do It like a Dude" was Jessie's debut single, she had previously written songs for other artists, including Miley Cyrus's international hit "Party in the U.S.A." The track was produced by The Invisible Men and Parker & James.

Background

"Do It like a Dude" was written by Jessie J, George Astasio, Jason Pebworth, Jon Shave, Kyle Abrahams and Peter Ighile and was produced by The Invisible Men and Parker & James.  Cornish originally wrote the song with Rihanna in mind because "Rude Boy" was released at the time, partly inspiring Cornish to write the song. She then sent the song to her label, Island Records, before sending it to Rihanna's management. Island then insisted the song become Cornish's first single, since they thought it was 'amazing'.

In 2014, after "Bang Bang", her collaboration with Ariana Grande and Nicki Minaj, Cornish revealed she had tried getting Minaj on "Do It like a Dude" but it had "never happened". However, Minaj denied this, saying that she wanted to appear on the track, but no one ever asked her.

Composition

"Do It like a Dude" is an R&B song which features hip hop beats and rock riffs. According to the sheet music published by Sony/ATV Music Publishing at Musinotes.com, "Do It like a Dude" is set in common time with a tempo of 140 beats per minute. Written in the key of D minor, the song features a basic chord progression of Dm–F–C–B. J's voice spans from the low note of A3 to the high note of C6. According to PopMatters Max Feldman, J speaks patois on the song. J said to Artistdirect that "Do It like a Dude" is about equality and self-confidence.

Critical reception
Stephen Thomas Erlewine from Allmusic said that "Do It like a Dude" as one of the best tracks from Who You Are.
Nick Levine of Digital Spy gave the song a positive review stating, "Now here's how to make an entrance into the capricious, peacock-packed party of pop." Rolling Stone Erika Berlin awarded the "fierce" song three out of five stars and praised its chorus. Max Feldman of PopMatters called the song's chorus "chunky and cheeky, with some infectious chilli-infused pre-choral warbling", but criticised J's "patois" vocals.

Chart performance
In the United Kingdom, "Do It like a Dude" debuted on the UK Singles Chart at number 25 on 28 November 2010 as the third highest new entry of the week. Following a decline during December, the single climbed 13 places to number 21 on 26 December and again climbed a further 3 places the week after to a number 18. Following the announcement that Jessie J had topped the BBC's Sound of 2011 poll, "Do It like a Dude" propelled 13 places into the top 10 at number 5 on 9 January 2011. On its second week in the Top 10, the single climbed 3 places to a peak of number 2; being beaten to the top spot only by Bruno Mars' "Grenade". The single has now gone on to sell 573,000 copies in the UK alone. In the Republic of Ireland, the single also saw a chart placement on the Irish Singles Chart, where it peaked at number 11.

Music video
The video was filmed on 25 and 26 October 2010, The video was directed by Emil Nava, An explicit version premiered 9 November 2010 and a clean version the next day on 4 Music. In the music video for "Price Tag", as J says the words "video hoes", a scene of her wearing the same outfit as in her "Do It like a Dude" video.

The video begins with a close-up shot of Jessie's black bejeweled lips as she sings. The scene then intercuts with: someone being tattooed, a woman slicing a pig's trotter, a woman doing some chemical experiments and licking a bottle of "poison", before following Jessie dancing in an orange hoodie and entering the flat where alt-looking women are seen throughout the video. The video also features Jessie dancing with back-up dancers, and a party with people acting fiercely. The video ends with Jessie, clad in a revealing, plunging white top and black costume bra, shaking her head exaggeratedly and laying down, disappearing from the scene.

Live performances
Jessie J performed an acoustic rendition of "Do It like a Dude" at the 2011 BRIT Awards launch on 13 January 2011. On 27 April 2011, she sang the song on MuchMusic's New.Music.Live. Also, Jessie presented the song in the 2011 MTV VMAs. On 5 April 2011, Jessie J performed "Do It like a Dude" at the 2011 Music of Black Origin Awards, where she also won four awards that night.

Track listings

Charts

Weekly charts

Year-end charts

Certifications

Release history

References

2010 debut singles
Island Records singles
2011 singles
Jessie J songs
Songs written by Jessie J
2010 songs
Songs written by Jason Pebworth
Songs written by George Astasio
Songs written by Jon Shave
Songs with feminist themes
Songs written by Parker Ighile